Édouard Drouot (3 April 1859 – 22 May 1945) was a French sculptor. His work was part of the sculpture event in the art competition at the 1924 Summer Olympics.

References

1859 births
1945 deaths
19th-century French sculptors
20th-century French sculptors
French male sculptors
Olympic competitors in art competitions
People from Haute-Marne
19th-century French male artists